The National Convention Center (NCC) is a major convention center located on Thăng Long Boulevard in Nam Từ Liêm district of Hanoi, Vietnam. The convention center was designed by Meinhard von Gerkan and Nikolaus Goetze of Gerkan, Marg and Partners.

Overview

History
Meinhard von Gerkan, who previously designed the Vietnamese National Assembly building, was assigned to design the National Convention Center. Four designs were presented for consideration in April 2004. In the end, a design called "Surfing the East Sea" was unanimously chosen as the official design of the project by a panel of 31 Vietnamese architects.

The project received government approval on October 25, 2004 and construction started on November 15 the same year. On October 15, 2006, the Vietnam National Convention Center was inaugurated.

Architecture
The design of the center takes inspirations from Hạ Long Bay, a World Heritage Site in Quảng Ninh Province, Vietnam.

Facilities
This complex includes a public square, a helipad, an on-ground and underground parking lot of 1,100 parking spaces, residential area and landscaping features. It is equipped with solar power panels as a back-up energy source. 

 exhibition space
Banquet Hall, accommodating up to 1,800 people, 
Main Meeting Hall, 3,747 seats with a divider for a smaller configuration, 
1 executive ballroom
2 executive meeting halls
3 press and media rooms
24 meeting rooms/ 72 breakouts

Hostings

NCC has hosted many high-profile political events. Some of the significant events include:
2006 APEC Economic Leaders' Meeting
16th ASEAN Summit (2010)
11th National Congress of the Communist Party of Vietnam (2011)
12th National Congress of the Communist Party of Vietnam (2016)

Many entertainment and exhibition events were also held at NCC. Multiple international artists including 2NE1, Boys Like Girls, Kenny G, Kelly Rowland or Lenka have performed here as well as Kinderworld (SIS@Gamuda, SIS@CIPUTRA, SIS@VanPHUC), the only school in Hanoi to have performed at a major convention hall with a capacity larger than 3,000.

It also hosted the 2019 League of Legends Mid-Season Invitational Group stage and the esports events of the 2021 Southeast Asian Games.

References

External links

 

Buildings and structures in Hanoi
Buildings and structures completed in 2006
Convention centers in Vietnam
Gerkan, Marg and Partners buildings
2006 establishments in Vietnam